State Route 169 (SR 169) is a  state highway that runs south-to-north through portions of Wayne, Appling, Tattnall, and Evans counties in the southeastern part of the U.S. state of Georgia.

Route description
SR 169 begins at an intersection with US 341/SR 27 in Jesup, in Wayne County. It heads northwest through rural parts of the county, until it enters Appling County. Shortly after the county line is an intersection with SR 121, with SR 144 immediately afterward. The three highways head concurrently to the northeast. They cross over the Altamaha River into Tattnall County. They continue to the northeast, passing SR 178. A little farther to the northeast, SR 144 departs to the northeast, and then, SR 121 departs to the northwest. SR 169 continues to the northeast, intersecting SR 23/SR 57. It curves to the northwest and then heads northward, until it enters Evans County. In the town of Bellville, if first meets US 280/SR 30, and then SR 292. The highway continues to the north, intersects SR 169 Spur, and curves to the northeast. Almost immediately is SR 129, and then the Canoochee River. SR 169 continues to the northeast until it meets its northern terminus, an intersection with US 25/US 301/SR 73, northeast of Claxton.

SR 169 is not part of the National Highway System, a system of roadways important to the nation's economy, defense, and mobility.

Major intersections

Spur route

State Route 169 Spur (SR 169 Spur) is a  spur route that exists entirely within the west central part of Evans County. Its route is located southwest of the Canoochee River.

It begins at an intersection with the SR 169 mainline north of Bellville. It heads north-northeast and curves to meet its northern terminus, at an intersection with SR 129 about  later.

SR 169 Spur is not part of the National Highway System, a system of roadways important to the nation's economy, defense, and mobility.

See also

References

External links

 Georgia Roads (Routes 161 - 180)

169
Transportation in Wayne County, Georgia
Transportation in Appling County, Georgia
Transportation in Tattnall County, Georgia
Transportation in Evans County, Georgia